Gino Santercole (21 November 1940 – 8 June 2018) was an Italian singer/songwriter, guitarist, and actor.  He was well known for his breakthrough hit "Questo vecchio pazzo mondo" ("This old crazy world"), a cover of P.F. Sloan's "Eve of Destruction," and for the song "Such a Cold Night Tonight" that he sang in the movie Yuppi Du.

Life

Early life

Santercole was born in Milan, Italy, on 21 November 1940. His family is originally from the south eastern region of  Apulia. Santercole's mother, Rosa, was the sister of the singer, comedian, and movie director Adriano Celentano.

Santercole lost his father as a child. He spent some years in college, and was then forced to go to work by himself. He was fond of rock'n'roll, and in his free time he learned to play the guitar.

Celentano recruited Santercole for his group, the Rock Boys, when his second guitarist, Ico Cerutti, left the group. Santercole became a Rock Boy just in time to participate in the First Italian Festival of Rock and Roll, held on 18 May 1957 at the Via Piranesi Ice Palace in Milan. Record producer Walter Guertler was in the festival audience, and signed the Rock Boys to a recording contract right after the show.

The Rebels and the solo debut
The Rock Boys evolved into the Rebels, who backed up Celentano and other singers such as Ricky Clem Sacco and Gianco. Celentano began a solo career and soon Santercole became the group's lead guitarist.

Santercole began singing as well; the first song he sang on was "Sono un fallito" ("I am a Failure"), a cover of Ray Charles's "Busted." That was followed by his own solo single, 'Silver Star', in December 1964, which got good airplay and chart success in early 1965. In 1965 he released a solo EP, credited to Santercole with Celentano and Don Backy.

Then in 1966 Santercole sang on and released the single "Questo vecchio pazzo mondo" ("This old crazy world"). The song is a cover of the folk-rock/protest song written by P.F. Sloan, 'Eve of Destruction' which became a hit when covered by Barry McGuire in 1966. Santercole performs the song in Cantagiro in 1967. Celentano used the same music tracks and lyrics in 1984 on his album I miei americani (My American), a collection of U.S. hits translated into Italian, and again in the first episode of his 1999 television show,   Francamente me ne infischio (Frankly I don't care) in 1999.

In 1966, Santercole participated in Festival di Sanremo with his uncle, Ico Cerutti and Pilade, performing "Il ragazzo della via Gluck" ("The Kid from Gluck Street") under the name Trio of Clan; however, they are eliminated in the early evening.

Meanwhile, the kinship with Celentano is strengthened. Celentano separated from his Milena Cantù and married actress and singer Claudia Mori, while Santercole fell in love with and married Mori's sister, Anna Moroni (becoming the brother-in-law of his uncle). Anna Santercole will bear him two sons.

Composer and actor

Santercole has written many famous and significant songs of Italian music, including some of great success. His first success was "A Caress into a Fist" ("Una carezza in un pugno"), initially recorded by Celantano as a B-side in 1968. The song has become an evergreen of Italian pop music is, having been used several times by Celentano in his television programs. In 1992 the singer and Fiorello imitator included a new cover of "A Caress into a Fist"  on his album Again fake.

"A Caress into a Fist" was the first song Santercole wrote. He had never tried to write a song, because he did not believe he could. One day, though, when learning a new song – Bert Kaempfert's "Strangers in the Night"—on guitar, he found himself varying notes and finally playing a completely different song, the one that became "A Caress into a Fist". 
 
Other hits followed: "Svalutation", a rock song with electric guitar, on his 1976 album (which also contained his songs "The Boat" and "Room 21"), "A boy on the Lion", and "Remarkably" (written initially for Mina, with lyrics by Luciano Beretta).

Santercole also composed music for movies. He is credited with the soundtracks of Segni Particolari: Bellisimo (Distinguishing Features: Beautiful) (1983) and  Joan Lui – Ma Un Giorno Nel Paese Arrivo 10 Di Lunedi (1985). In addition he did numerous work on the music of  Celentano's films; a highlight being his hit "Such a Cold Night Tonight" (which Santercole sang in English), from the movie Yuppi du.

In 1969, Santercole also began an acting career. While he had previously played cameos and parts, his first substantial role came in the 1969 film Serafino (Seraphim). One day he visited Celentano, who had landed a role in the movie, on set; the director, Paolo Germi, saw him, thought he had a good face, and cast him as the Sergeant.

As an actor, Santercole has worked with directors like Pietro Germi, Dino Risi, Giuliano Montaldo, Luigi Comencini, Luciano Salce, and Mario Monicelli. He has cast credits in four movies: Mani Di Velluto (1979), Yuppi du (1975), Il Commisario Pepe (1969), and Serafino (1969).

Return to television and reconciliation with Celentano

In 1999 Santercole collaborated on the new album by Pio Trebbi, lead singer of the Clan Celentano, who was experiencing economic difficulties: the two wrote the song "The Last of the Clan'. To help, Santercole contacted Celentano, who decided to join the two in an episode of his television program Francamente me ne infischio. The symbol of peace between the two after that in the past there had been some disagreements.

On 22 January 2007 Santercole agreed to participate with Varese at a celebration of the 50th anniversary of rock 'n' roll in Italy, along with Pennant, the Rebels, Rosie, Ghigo Agosti, and others. In September 2008 Santercole was a guest at the Festival in Venice with Adriano Celentano for the new release of Yuppi Du. 2009 in June he hosted the programme of Rai Two Stracult Show of Marco Giusti German in a sketch comedian with Stefano Sarcinelli and Nicola Vicidomini.

On 13 April 2010 Santercole released a new album, titled Nobody is Alone, on which he had composed all of the music. (Mimmo Politanò wrote the lyrics).

Discography

With the Rebels
45s
1960 Rebels in blues/blue shirt -(Italdisc, IR-69)
1961 Henry VIII/200 per hour -(Boško Peraica, QB 8031)
1962 La cavalcata/Serenata a Valle Chiara -(Clan Celentano, ACC 24002)
1963 at nine o'clock in the bar/Danny boy – Clan Celentano/I Rebels, R 6000; (The b-side is credited to Christmas Befanino and the Raebels)
1964 who is la ragazza del Clan?/quella donna -(Clan Celentano/I Rebels, R 6002)

LPs
1968 I Ribelli – (Dischi Ricordi, SMRP 9052)
1988 I Ribelli live – (CGD, LSM1315)

CDs
 2002: I Ribelli (The Rebels). (Sony/BMG 191192)
 2010: Cantano Adriano (Sing Adriano). (Indie Europe/Zoom 7794766)

Solo
45s
1964: attached to ceiling/If you want -(Clan Celentano, ACC 24017)
1964: Silver Star/without shoes -(Clan Celentano, ACC 24020)
1965: Oh Rose ' Rosetta/ladies and gentlemen -(Clan Celentano, ACC 24025)
1966: this old crazy world/our time -(Clan Celentano, ACC 24042)
1967: the fight of love/soul -(Clan Celentano, ACC 24056)
1968: Jane and John/how beautiful the day -(Clan Celentano, ACC 24076)
1969: Poor Gino/Barbara -(Clan Celentano, BF 69024)
1970: the King of fantasy/how sad night -(Clan Celentano, BF 69045)
1975: Such a cold night tonight/the ballad -(Clan CelentanoCLN 3040)
1978: Giovanna/Uacci-du amor -(Valiant, ZBV 7087)
1980: Change for change, no!/Ancora us -(MONLupus, 4909; with Blue Valente)
1981: Adriano t set fire/the love -(Cherry White, CB-85; with Blue Valente)
1982: Love is blue/Cavomba -(DailyMusic, DLM-31014 Blue;)
2010: nobody is only -(Sony)
EPs
1965: Hi guys/who have it with me/I'm a failure/I want to sleep (-Hi! Boys, ACC-SP-25002; with Adriano Celentano and Don Backy; Santercole sings "I'm a failure")
CDs
2000: Gino Santercole. (D'azur 1525) TBP series Yesterdays; re-recording with new arrangements of the biggest hits)
2005: Il Meglio (The Best). (DV More). UPC 8014406624564
2010: Nessuno è solo (No one is alone). (Sony Music).
Soundtracks
1983: Segni Particolari: Bellisimo (Distinguishing Features: Beautiful) (CGD Records 20406) (Cetra LPX 119).
1985: Joan Lui – ma un giorno nel paese arrivo io di lunedì (Joan Lui – but one day I arrive in the country on Monday).

 Filmography 

1960: San Remo, la grande sfida (San Remo, the Great Challenge) (dir. Piero Vivarelli) - himself
1961: Io bacio... tu baci (I Kiss ... You Kiss) (dir. Piero Vivarelli)
1963: Uno strano tipo (A Strange Kind) (dir. Lucio Fulci) - himself
1964: Cleopazza (dir. Carlo Moscovini)
1964: Super rapina a Milano (Super Heist in Milan) (dir.  Adriano Celentano and Piero Vivarelli) - Gino
1968: Rose rosse per il führer (Red Roses for the Fuhrer) (dir. Fernando di Leo) - British parachutist
1968: Serafino (Seraphim) (dir. Pietro Germi) - Sergeant
1969: Il commisario Pepe (Police Chief Pepe) (dir. Ettore Scolo) - Oreste
1969: Infanzia, vocazione e prime esperienze di Giacomo Casanova, veneziano (Childhood, vocation and early experiences of Giacomo Casanova, Venetian) (dir. Luigi Comencini) - Baffo
1969: Il giovane normale (The Normal Young Man) (dir. Dino Risi) - Giorgio
1971: Er più – Storia d'amore e di coltello (Er more: Story of love and a Knife) (dir. Sergio Corbucci) - Verdicchio
1972: Il sindacalista (The Union) (dir. Luciano Salce) - Operaio
1973: The Assassination of Matteotti (dir. Florestano Vancini) - Fascist
1973: Li chiamavano i tre moschettieri... invece erano quattro (They Were Called Three Musketeers ... But They Were Four) (dir. Silvio Amadio) - Athos
1974: I figli di nessuno (Nobody's Children) (dir. Bruno Gaburro)
1974: Sesso in testa (Sex Head) (dir. Sergio Ammirata [and Fernando de Leo]) - Diana's boyfriend
1974: Milano odia: la polizia non può sparare (Almost Human) (dir. Umberto Lenzi) - Vittorio
1975: Yuppi du (dir. Adriano Celentano [and Miky del Prety]) - Napoleone
1975: Amore vuol dir gelosia (Love is the Meaning of Jealousy) (dir. Mauro Severino) - Amos
1975: Labbra di lurido blu (Lips of Lurid Blue) (dir. Alberto) - Alberto
1976: L'Agnese va a morire (And Agnes Chose to Die) (dir. Giuliano Montaldo) - Piròn
1978: Un amore così fragile, così violento (A Love So Fragile, So Violent (dir. Leros Pittoni) - Russo
1978: Geppo il folle (Geppo the Crazy) (dir. Adriano Celentano) - First journalist
1978: Viaggio con Anita (Travels with Anita) (dir. Mario Monicelli) - Camionista
1979: Mani di velluto (Velvet Hands) (dir. Franco Castellano and Giuseppe Moccia) - Leo di Giordano
1979: Switch (dir. Giuseppe Collizi) - Annibale
1979: Super Andy, il fratello brutto di Superman (Super Andy, Superman's Bad Brother) (dir. Paolo Banchini) - Superkid
1979: Profumo e balocchi (Perfume and Toys) (dir. Angelo Jacono) - Monica Father
1980: Sono fotogenico (I'm Photogenic) (dir. Dino Risi) - Sergio
1982: Marco Polo (TV mini-series, dir. Giuliano Montaldo) - Giuseppe
1987: Fantastico 8 (TV Mini-Series, dir. Luigi Bonori) - himself
1988: Rally (TV Series, dir. Sergio Martino)
2004: Diritto di Difesa (Right of Defense) (TV Series, dir. Gianfrancesco Lazotti and Donatella Maiorca)
2010: De Sancta Quiete'' - (final film role)

Except where noted, film information courtesy of Internet Movie Database..

References

External links 
 
 More Gino Santercole on YouTube
 Eve Of Destruction & Italian versions
 More on Gino Santercole's Eve Of Destruction translation & cover

1940 births
2018 deaths
Italian composers
Italian male composers
Italian male singers
Italian-language singers
Singers from Milan